Ruby Lynn Reyner is an American singer, songwriter, musical playwright and actress known as the star of the Playhouse of the Ridiculous and associated as the leader of the glam rock band Ruby and the Rednecks in New York City. She and her band performed on the New York Club circuit such as Max's Kansas City and CBGB's during the 1970s]. Reyner also did film starring in Heaven Wants Out  by director Robert Feinberg in 1970.

Reyner was included among Warhol Factory denizens, artists and superstars and modeled for photographer Francesco Scavullo for his photo book Scavullo: Francesco Scavullo Photographs 1948–1984. She also modeled for Leee Black Childers, who included her in his 130 Fabulous Faces.

Throughout the 1970s Reyner continued performing with her band on the downtown glam punk rock scene in NYC until experiencing a serious illness in 1982 which suspended her career for several years. It wasn't until the 1990s that she returned to music and performance continuing until today. Reyner last directed, performed and produced her play Singin'in the ER in Fall 2019 at Theater for the New City in New York City.

Early life and career 
Born Lynn Reyner on January 27, 1948, in Brooklyn, New York to Dr. Franklin Cooper Reyner and actress Rubye Reyner (né Rubye Meyers), Ruby Lynn Reyner spent her infancy under the care of her maternal grandmother and family in Manhattan Beach, Brooklyn. Her father was a physician, an Ob/Gyn Specialist, who moved the family to Long Island, New York.

Reyner graduated from South Side Sr. High School in Rockville Centre, then entered Emerson College. She began a career in modeling and attended a rehearsal of The Playhouse of the Ridiculous and was introduced to John Vacarro who immediately put her in the chorus of Conquest of the Universe. She soon rose to the feature role as Alice, the conqueror's wife. She starred in many Playhouse productions during the 1970s and 1980s.

Theatre 

 Ruby Lynn Reyner performed with Playhouse of the Ridiculous and was added to the cast of Drag Queens and Warhol superstars. She appeared in 40 Vacarro productions such as Conquest of the Universe, Lady Godiva, Heaven Grand in Amber Orbit, Cock Strong, Son of Cock Strong, and Pineapple Face.

She remained with the Playhouse for many years starring in Heaven Grand in Amber Orbit by Jackie Curtis, Sissy by Seth Allan, and La Bohemia written and directed by John Vacarro. She won the Drama Desk Award for outstanding performance in La Bohemia and received good notices for her Broadway role of Mary, Queen of Scots in Paul Foster's Elizabeth I.

Reyner and her co-writer Gordon Bressac created and produced several musical variety shows at Crystal Fields Theater for the New City, including Voidville 1 and Vandals of 1981. In addition, she made appearances in other shows like Jimmy Camecia's Hot Peaches. During the 1990s, she wrote, directed and starred in Singing' in the Islands and Christmas in the Islands.

Reyner continues to write, direct and perform in the show Singin' in the ER, a satirical play about her own hospital experiences, produced at the Theater for the New City during Fall 2019.

Music 

Reyner sang in many Playhouse productions and formed a band with her collaborating musical artists Ruby and the Rednecks. She wrote satirical songs, many from the Playhouse, with her partner and collaborator John Madera and debuted at the Mercer Arts Center where she opened for The New York Dolls and thus became part of the glam rock movement and punk rock scene at Max's Kansas City and CBGB's.

Ruby has performed with the Rednecks since the 1970s. About her performance when singing her song "Beat Me Daddy", Village Voice wrote "Ruby threw out an oversized Teddy Bear, shrieked, stomped on the bear, kicked it, clawed at the audience while her claque (from Interview magazine I was told) roared back their delight. Meanwhile Michael Goldstein of the Soho Weekly News was telling Tina Weymouth, Trixie A. Balm and myself that Ruby was going to make it big because she has what it takes."

She has produced two albums for Ruby and the Rednecks: From the Wrong Side of Town produced with Peter Crowley and Live Again! at CBGB's a live album, narrated by Jayne County.

Film 
Ruby starred in Heaven Wants Out in 1970. It features Holly Woodlawn, Mary Woronov, Ondine and the photographer Francesco Scavullo.

Heaven Wants Out remained on the shelf incomplete until the 2000s when the film's history was told by the documentary Finishing Heaven, appearing on HBO in 2008.

Reyner also had the lead role in 1971's About Me: A Musical by Robert Frank. Other appearances include Beautiful Darling and Generation Um.

Filmography

Broadway

Off Broadway and Off Off Broadway

Awards

Ruby and the Rednecks Discography

Albums 
 From the Wrong Side of Town (2004)
 Live Again! At CBGB's (2008)

Compilation albums 
 Max's Kansas City 1976 & Beyond (2017)

References

External links 
 

1948 births
Living people
People associated with The Factory
20th-century American actresses
20th-century American singers
20th-century American women singers
21st-century American actresses
21st-century American singers
21st-century American women singers
Actresses from New York City
American women rock singers
American women singer-songwriters
American film actresses
American rock songwriters
American television actresses
American voice actresses
Singers from New York City
American dramatists and playwrights
Singer-songwriters from New York (state)